Michael Docherty (September 11, 1955 – January 19, 2016) was a Scottish comic book and animation artist living in California. He is best known for his work on Marvel Comic's 1980s and 1990s Conan comics.
Since the mid-1990s he began on drawing concept designs and storyboards for animation, live-action TV and movie projects, but mainly focusing on animation.

Bibliography

Marvel Comics
 Conan the King (1985)
 Savage Sword of Conan (1989)
 Conan: the Horn of Azoth (1990, graphic novel)
 Conan the Barbarian (until 1995)

Other
 Mars Attacks
 Specwar (Special Warfare) (2001, Peterfour Productions)
 Jungle Reign (graphic novels)

References

External links
 
 Mike Docherty at Mike's Amazing World of Comics
 Mike Docherty at the Grand Comics Database
 Mike Docherty at the Lambiek Comiclopedia
 Mike Docherty at Legeacy.com
 Blog about Docherty by Eddie Campbell

Scottish comics artists
Scottish animators
1955 births
2016 deaths